Meral Okay (née Katı; September 20, 1959 – April 9, 2012) was a Turkish actress, film producer and screenwriter.

Early life
Okay was born on September 20, 1959 in Ankara to military judge Ata Katı and Türkan as the second child. During her childhood, she moved with her family across Turkey due to her father's duty. After completing the high school in Ankara, she began working at the governmental agency "Turkish Grain Board" (TMO).

During the 1980 Turkish coup d'état era, she was a member of the socialist Workers Party of Turkey (TİP) and union spokesperson at her workplace.

In 1983, Meral Katı moved to Istanbul to enter the daily Günaydın. She later contributed to the establishment of the publication company "İletişim", and took part in the team that prepared the Turkish edition of Playboy magazin.

She married in 1984 to stage and movie actor Yaman Okay, she had already met in Ankara. Her husband's profession paved her the way for entry into the world of cinema.

Career
Meral Okay became known for roles in Turkish films and television series. She also produced the television series, Second Spring from 1998 to 2001. For one of her last projects, Okay worked as the main screenwriter for the historical TV series, Muhteşem Yüzyıl, based on the life of Ottoman sultan Suleiman the Magnificent.

Family life
Her husband Yaman Okay died in 1993 at the age of 41 from pancreatic cancer. In the summer months of 2011, Meral Okay was diagnosed with lung cancer. She died from complications of the disease on April 9, 2012, at the age of 52. Following the religious funeral at Bebek Mosque, she was buried beside her husband's grave at the Zincirlikuyu Cemetery.

For her role in the movie Beynelmilel, she was awarded "Best Supporting Actress" at the 2007 International Adana Golden Boll Film Festival.

Filmography
Her notable works are:

As actress

As screenwriter

Other

References

External links

1959 births
2012 deaths
Actresses from Ankara
Turkish people of Circassian descent
Turkish film actresses
Turkish television actresses
Turkish women film producers
Turkish female screenwriters
20th-century Turkish actresses
21st-century Turkish actresses
21st-century Turkish screenwriters
Deaths from lung cancer in Turkey
Burials at Zincirlikuyu Cemetery